The  is a Japanese theatrical company connected to the Sunaoka Office talent agency. The company was founded by Tōzaburō Sunaoka in July 1952. It is located in Ebisunishi.

Attached people

Acting alumni

Voice-acting alumni

Associated companies
Blue Shuttle
Sunaoka Office

External links
Himawari Theatre Group home page

Japanese voice actor management companies
Mass media in Tokyo